P.O.T. was a Filipino rock band, formed in 1994 and officially disbanded in 2005. The band was fronted by Karl Roy who also fronted the bands Advent Call and Kapatid. The group is famous for their 1997 remake of the song "Yugyugan Na", originally performed by The Advisors in 1977. The band held a reunion concert on July 22, 2006, at The 70's Bistro in Quezon City. On 1997, Harley Alarcon left the band and was replaced by Jay Alviar who also left a year later. In 1999, Ian Umali left the band to go back to school and continue his studies.

In February 2005, EMI Philippines release a repackaged version of the first (and only) P.O.T. album. with an additional bonus tracks a new version of the song Ulitin", “Piece of This", and “Panaginip", as well as a brand new song.

The initials of the band name P.O.T. is a pseudo-acronym, meaning it doesn't stand for anything at all or as what Karl Roy stated in an interview, fans of the band can freely decide in making up any meanings that fit the initials.

In the early morning of March 13, 2012, Karl Roy died due to cardiac arrest.

Return

P.O.T. performed again for the first time in almost 16 years on June 25, 2022, at The 70's Bistro with original members Paraguya and Umali, Red Dela Peña of Ojo Rojo filling in for vocals, and Reli de Vera on drums. The band is slated for another concert on July 16, 2022, at 19 East in Parañaque City.

Members
Karl Roy† – lead vocals
Mally Paraguya – bass guitar
Francis Reyes – guitars
Ian Umali – guitars
Jeff Lima – drums
Carol Hope Castillo – drums
Harley Alarcon – drums
Jayman Alviar – drums

Session musicians
Tom Vinoya – Keyboards
Jay Gapasin – Percussion

Discography

Studio albums
P.O.T. (1997; PolyEast Records)
Remastered (2005; PolyEast Records)

Singles
"Yugyugan Na!"
"Fishcake"
"F.Y.B."
"Hindi N'yo Alam"
"Overload"
"Love to See"
"Monkey on my Back"
"Posse-bility"
"Panaginip"
"Don't Blink"
"Ulitin"
"Piece of This"
"It Don't Matter"

Awards

References

External links
GMA News Online - Karl Roy rocked this world to the end

Filipino rock music groups
Musical groups established in 1994
Musical groups disestablished in 2005
1994 establishments in the Philippines
Musical groups from Manila